Karavayevo is a rural locality (a selo) in Pekshinskoye Rural Settlement, Petushinsky District, Vladimir Oblast, Russia. The population was 190 as of 2010. There are 3 streets.

Geography 
Karavayevo is located 32 km north of Petushki (the district's administrative centre) by road. Kalinino is the nearest rural locality.

References 

Rural localities in Petushinsky District